Kal nad Kanalom is a village in the hills east of Kanal in the Littoral region of Slovenia. It lies on the southwest part of the Banjšice Plateau.

Name
The name of the settlement was changed from Kal to Kal nad Kanalom in 1952.

Church
The parish church in the settlement is dedicated to Saint George and belongs to the Diocese of Koper. A second church belonging to this parish is built on a hill above the hamlet of Koprivišče and is dedicated to Saint Thomas.

References

External links
Kal nad Kanalom on Geopedia
Kal nad Kanalom on the Kanal Tourist Information site

Populated places in the Municipality of Kanal